The 50th Anniversary of the Republic Sculptures are 20 sculptures erected in Istanbul that were created by selected Turkish sculptors to mark the 50th anniversary of the Turkish Republic. The sculptures were erected in various parks and squares in Istanbul in around 1973. Many of them were damaged, destroyed, lost, or moved, and only a handful remain today.

It was difficult for Turkish sculptors to get their works seen in the years between 1950 and 1960; what sculptors needed was for their sculptures to be displayed in public spaces. There were very few public sculptures, other than monuments, in Turkey until 1973. In May 1972, the Committee for the 50th Anniversary of the Republic Celebrations gathered at the headquarters of the Governor of Istanbul. It initially planned to commission 50 sculptures to mark the anniversary; however, due to limited funds the number was reduced to 20. On 13 September 1973, the sketches and photographs sent by the 20 selected artists were approved by the board members of the committee. The initiative was a turning point for Turkish sculpture. For the first time, sculptors were given a chance, outside the scope of monuments, to create sculptures for predetermined locations. This allowed a shift towards modern sculpture. The result of the project was 20 sculptures erected in public spaces in Istanbul by important sculptors which reflected their original sculpting style.

Many of the sculptures were lost, damaged or removed (or both), some only a few days after they were erected. Güzel İstanbul, by Gürdal Duyar, was found by certain traditional conservatives to be "indecent"; it was removed from Karaköy Square and eventually taken to Yıldız Park. İşçi by Muzaffer Ertoran was targeted in attacks. The fate of Nusret Suman's Mimar Sinan is unknown. İkimiz by Namık Denizhan was removed due to "damage from external factors". Birlik by Mehmet Uyanık was demolished by a municipal compressor gun in 1986. Yükseliş by Bihrat Mavitran was destroyed for road construction in 1984. Yağmur by Ferit Özşen was damaged and eventually removed. Abstract sculptures which were lost include one by Füsun Onur which was removed during Bedrettin Dalan's municipal tenure in 1985, one by Seyhun Topuz which collapsed due to "natural causes" in 1984, and one by Tamer Başoğlu which disappeared in 1986, while those by Yavuz Görey and Metin Haseki were probably stolen for their bronze and copper.

Sculptures

Recent events
In 2011, seven of the sculptures were cleaned and restored as part of the "sculpture project". Hüseyin Anka Özkans' Yankı was reportedly restored to its original state. As of September 2011, it was planned to restore the Abstract in Maçka, Bahar in Emirgan Park, the Republic 50 Years Monument in Galatasaray Square, Dayanışma in Fındıklı Park, Figür in front of the Muhsin Ertuğrul Theater, and the abstract sculpture at Bebek children's park.

References

Sources

1970s in Istanbul
1973 sculptures
1973 in Turkey
1973-related lists
Culture in Istanbul
Events in Istanbul
Sculptures
Sculptures in Turkey